Notorious Motorcycle Club may refer to two different, unaffiliated outlaw motorcycle clubs:

 Notorious Motorcycle Club (Australia), a motorcycle club formerly based in Sydney, New South Wales, Australia
 Notorious Motorcycle Club (Germany), a motorcycle club based in Wuppertal, North Rhine-Westphalia, Germany